Yolkino is a rural locality (a khutor) and the administrative center of Yulkinskoye Rural Settlement, Chernyshkovsky District, Volgograd Oblast, Russia. The population was 445 as of 2010. There are 9 streets.

Geography 
Yolkino is located 18 km southeast of Chernyshkovsky (the district's administrative centre) by road. Aseyev is the nearest rural locality.

References 

Rural localities in Chernyshkovsky District